Dapo may refer to:

People

Given name
 Dapo Abiodun (born 1960), Nigerian businessman and politician
 Dapo Adelugba (1939–2014), Nigerian academic
 Dapo Afolayan or Oladapo Afolayan (born 1997), English football player 
 Dapo Folorunsho Asaju (born 1961), Nigerian bishop and academic
 Dapo Lam Adesina (born 1978), Nigerian politician
 Dapo Mebude (born 2001), Scottish football player
 Dapo Olorunyomi (born 1957), Nigerian journalist
 Dapo Sarumi, Nigerian politician
 Dapo Torimiro, Nigerian musician

Surname
 Aida Đapo, real name of Idda van Munster (born 1990), Bosnian celebrity
 Amra Đapo (born 1976), Croatian basketball player
 Ronnie Dapo (born 1952), American child actor
 Siphamandla Dapo (born 1989), South African cricketer

Places
 
 Dapo Pond, Taitung County, Taiwan
 
 Dapo-Iboké, Ivory Coast

Other
 Dapo language (disambiguation)
 Da-Po Junior High School, part of the system of education in Taoyuan City